Colmenares is a surname. Notable people with the surname include:

Dayana Colmenares (born 1984), Venezuelan beauty pageant titleholder
Grecia Colmenares (born 1962), Venezuelan-Argentine actress
José Pérez Colmenares (1914–1944), Venezuelan baseball player
Luis Andres Colmenares (1990–2010), Colombian student
Neri Colmenares (born 1959), Filipino human rights lawyer and activist
Néstor Colmenares (born 1987), Venezuelan basketball player
Octavio Colmenares (born 1989), Mexican footballer
Pedro Vázquez Colmenares (1934–2012), Mexican politician
Ricardo Letts Colmenares (1937–2021), Peruvian politician
Samuel Colmenares, Venezuelan Paralympic athlete
Vidal Colmenares (born 1952), Venezuelan folk singer
Adrian Colmenares (born 1991), Filipino Fashion Designer and Celebrity Stylist